Fernando Raúl Romero González (born 24 April 2000) is a Paraguayan professional footballer who plays as a forward for Australian club Melbourne Victory on loan from Paraguayan club Cerro Porteño. He has previously played for Club Nacional and Guaireña

Club career
Fernando has played 76 Paraguayan top flight games, and has also previously made appearances in Copa Libertadores and Copa Sudamericana. In February 2023, Fernando was loaned to Melbourne Victory until the end of the 2022–23 A-League Men season.

External links

References

Club Nacional footballers
Cerro Porteño players
Melbourne Victory FC players
Paraguayan Primera División players
2000 births
Living people